Kanishka III (Greco-Bactrian: ΚΑΝΗϷΚΕ Kanēške; Kharosthi: 𐨐𐨞𐨁𐨮𐨿𐨐 , ; Brahmi:  ,), was a Kushan emperor who reigned from around the year 265 CE to 270 CE. He is believed to have succeeded Vasishka and was succeeded by Vasudeva II. He ruled in areas of Northwestern India.

Inscriptions
In an inscription dated to the "Year 41" (probably of the 2nd century of the Kanishka era) and discovered on the borders of the river Ara in Punjab, he qualifies himself as a Maharaja rajadhiraja Devaputra Kaisara Kanishka ("Great King, King of Kings, Son of God, Caesar, Kanishka), suggesting some awareness of the Roman Empire as Kaisara seems to stand for "Caesar", and names himself as the son of Vajheshka, identified as Kushan ruler Vashishka. The inscription is rather worn and the reading Kaisara has been doubted, especially since no other mentions of this title are known from Kushan sources.

Coinage
It was initially thought that there were no definite coins known of him, as the "Kanishka" named in the coins was not differentiated. Only workmanship and graphical style in relation to other known rulers, tend to suggest attribution to this later Kanishka. However, this hypothesis was shaken by coin hoards being found in Tajikistan where coins of Kanishka III were found and identified in large numbers. All these finds north of the Oxus river seems to indicate that it was legal tender for a period of time.

Notes

Kushan emperors
3rd-century Indian monarchs